Adam Galloway Miller (21 October 1887 – 1972) was a Scottish footballer who played as a left back, primarily for Hamilton Academical.

He played in the 1911 Scottish Cup Final which Accies lost to Celtic after a replay. He also played in the Scottish Football League for St Mirren and Johnstone. At representative level, he was selected for Lanarkshire at both junior and senior grades, and was twice a reserve for the Scottish Football League XI.

Miller had three brothers who were also footballers, all playing for Hamilton Academical at some point: William had a short career, but John had productive spells with Aberdeen and Partick Thistle, while Tom was a regular with Liverpool and was capped three times for Scotland.

References

1887 births
1972 deaths
Scottish footballers
Footballers from Motherwell
Hamilton Academical F.C. players
Royal Albert F.C. players
St Mirren F.C. players
Johnstone F.C. players
Scottish Football League players
Association football defenders
Scottish Junior Football Association players
Larkhall United F.C. players